Dutch Guiana may refer to:
 Dutch colonisation of the Guianas, the coastal region between the Orinoco and Amazon rivers in South America
 Surinam (Dutch colony), commonly called "Dutch Guiana" after the loss of other large colonies in the area

See also
 The Guianas, French Guiana, Guyana, and Suriname in South America